Edward Harry Kelsey (4 June 193023 April 2019) was an English actor. He was best known for voicing the role of Joe Grundy for 34 years in The Archers on BBC Radio 4 and for voicing various other characters on television.

Early life and career 
Kelsey was born in Petersfield, Hampshire, and educated at Churcher's College. In 1954, he joined the Radio Drama Company by winning the Carlton Hobbs Bursary He was known for voicing the characters of Colonel K and Baron Silas Greenback in the animated series Danger Mouse produced by Cosgrove Hall. He also appeared on such British TV programmes as The Avengers, Softly, Softly, The Saint, Public Eye, Dempsey and Makepeace, Z-Cars, Juliet Bravo, Doctor Who, Minder, Angels, Casualty, The Vicar of Dibley, Reilly: Ace of Spies, Shoestring, Wives and Daughters, Anna of the Five Towns, Campion, The Tripods and EastEnders.

He acted in three Doctor Who stories, as a slave buyer in The Romans, Resno in The Power of the Daleks and Edu in The Creature from the Pit. He voiced Mr. Growbag in Wallace and Gromit: The Curse of the Were-Rabbit (2005), several characters in Victor and Hugo, Cosgrove Hall's The Reluctant Dragon and The Wind in the Willows (TV and film), H.H. Junketbury in The Talking Parcel, Farmer Listener and Forester in The Fool of the World and the Flying Ship and also for the voice of "The Thing" in another Cosgrove Hall production, Truckers, based on a book by Terry Pratchett.

Death 
He died of a heart attack on 23 April 2019 in Birmingham, West Midlands, England. He was 88 years old.

Filmography

References

External links

The Archers

1930 births
2019 deaths
English male film actors
English male radio actors
English male soap opera actors
English male stage actors
English male voice actors
People educated at Churcher's College
People from Petersfield
Male actors from Hampshire
The Archers
20th-century English male actors
21st-century English male actors